Charlie Coiner is an American football coach and the founder of 1st Down Technologies, LLC, a business based in an Austin, Texas and founded on August 16, 2011, that produces mobile applications for football coaches.  Coiner has worked as an assistant coach in the National Football League (NFL) with the Chicago Bears and the Buffalo Bills and in college football at a number of schools. Coiner was a defensive assistant on the North Carolina in 2010 which was the same season that the Tar Heels went to the Music City Bowl. His most recent coaching job was as the tight ends and special teams coach at the University of Tennessee.

In 2015, Coiner launched his first installment of FirstDown PlayBook.

References

External links
 Tennessee Volunteers bio 
 North Carolina press release

1960 births
Living people
Appalachian State Mountaineers football coaches
Austin Peay Governors football coaches
Buffalo Bills coaches
Chattanooga Mocs football coaches
Chicago Bears coaches
Louisville Cardinals football coaches
LSU Tigers football coaches
North Carolina Tar Heels football coaches
Minnesota Golden Gophers football coaches
Tennessee Volunteers football coaches
Texas Southern Tigers football coaches
Vanderbilt Commodores football coaches
Catawba College alumni
People from Waynesboro, Virginia